Eostriatolamia is an extinct genus of sharks in the family Odontaspididae. It was described by Gluckman in 1980. A new species, E. paucicorrugata, was described from the Cenomanian of Canada by Charlie J. Underwood and Stephen L. Cumbaa in 2010.

Species
 Eostriatolamia aktobensis Zhelezko, 1987
 Eostriatolamia lerichei Glikman & Zhelezko in Zhelezko, 1977
 Eostriatolamia paucicorrugata Underwood & Cumbaa, 2010
 Eostriatolamia segedini Glikman & Zhelezko in Zhelezko, 1977
 Eostriatolamia venusta Leriche, 1906
 Eostriatolamia subulata (Agassiz, 1844)

References

External links
 Eostriatolamia at the Paleobiology Database

Cretaceous sharks
Late Cretaceous fish of North America